The Canary Wharf Squash Classic 2013 is the 2013's Canary Wharf Squash Classic, which is a tournament of the PSA World Tour event International (Prize money: $50,000). The event took place at the East Wintergarden in London in England from 18 March to 22 March.

Prize money and ranking points
For 2013, the prize purse was $50,000. The prize money and points breakdown is as follows:

Seeds

Draw and results

See also
PSA World Tour 2013
Canary Wharf Squash Classic
2013 Men's British Open

References

External links
PSA Canary Wharf Squash Classic 2013 website
Canary Wharf Squash Classic 2013 official website

Canary Wharf
Canary Wharf Squash Classic
Canary Wharf Squash Classic
Canary Wharf Squash Classic
Squash competitions in London